The 2008 Crown Royal Presents the Dan Lowry 400 was the tenth stock car race of the 2008 NASCAR Sprint Cup Series. The event was held on May 3, 2008, before a crowd of 112,000, at Richmond International Raceway in Richmond, Virginia. Originally scheduled for 400 laps, Clint Bowyer won the race after a late caution and subsequent green–white–checker finish extended the race to 410 laps.

Summary
The race was telecast on Fox starting at 7:45 pm US EDT, with radio coverage on Sirius Satellite Radio and MRN beginning at 7:30 pm US EDT.  The race is named for Columbiana, Ohio resident Dan Lowry, who was the winner of an essay contest sponsored by race sponsor Crown Royal whisky. Clint Bowyer won the race.

Pre-race news
Last week at Talladega, Ken Schrader filled in on the #70 Haas CNC Racing car. Schrader was the interim substitute for Dario Franchitti's #40 Chip Ganassi Racing Dodge, but failed to qualify.
Johnny Sauter would return again to Haas and pilot their #70 ride for this race.

Race

The action came with 48 laps left. While Denny Hamlin who dominated the race, led on a fuel crisis, the caution flew for Casey Mears' crash. The crash involved Michael Waltrip in his self-owned #55 Toyota. The replays showed that Mears accidentally forced Waltrip into scraping across the wall. Then instantly afterwards Michael Waltrip pushed Mears around. These hits on Mears' rear caused him to eventually hit the wall nearly head-on. For the shove Waltrip was parked by NASCAR.

Denny Hamlin led 381 laps until a cut tire and a pit road penalty ended his day. On lap 398, Kyle Busch,
spun Dale Earnhardt Jr. into the wall, triggering an enormous amount of controversy over the matter and intense boos from the crowd, as Earnhardt was extremely popular due to his family relations with his famous father Dale Sr. Although many fans felt that Busch intentionally caused the accident, years later on Dirty Mo Radio Earnhardt would later address the incident and state that Busch did not intentionally cause the wreck. He would say that "Even in the moment, I knew that it wasn't [Busch] turning me on purpose." Earnhardt had said that Busch had simply had wanted to get a better run off of the corner, but had gotten loose and spun him. At the next Richmond race, Earnhardt would seem to get payback on Busch, as on lap 212 Earnhardt spun Busch heading into Turn 1. 

However, Clint Bowyer surged in front of Busch before the caution flag was thrown. Bowyer was able to hold off Busch and Mark Martin to score his second career cup win, despite leading only two laps. His win was the last one when numbered 07, and his win brought Chevrolet to having the most NASCAR wins in history.

Results

References

Crown Royal Presents The Dan Lowry 400
Crown Royal Presents The Dan Lowry 400
NASCAR races at Richmond Raceway